Indolent may refer to:

Laziness
A music label owned by Bertelsmann Music Group
indolent condition, a slowly progressive medical condition associated with little or no pain
The lowest of three grades of non-Hodgkin's lymphoma (NHL)
Indolent ulcers or Boxer ulcers, refractory corneal ulcers
Indolent carditis, a form of infective endocarditis that may also indicate rheumatic fever

See also
 Indolence (disambiguation)